Festival is the seventh studio album by the Turkish musician Kenan Doğulu. It reached commercial success in Turkey thanks to its hit single "Çakkıdı".

Track listing 
"Aşk Tanrısı" (writer-composer: Kenan Doğulu) - 1:53
"Aşk Kokusu" (writer-composer: Kenan Doğulu) - 4:38
"Çakkıdı" (writer-composer: Sezen Aksu) - 3:18
"Rahatla" (writer: Kenan Doğulu, composer: Kenan Doğulu, Marshall Curtly) - 2:52
"Rüzgar" (writer-composer: Kenan Doğulu) - 3:22
"Olmaz" (writer-composer: Kenan Doğulu) - 3:33
"Baş Harfi Ben" (writer-composer: Kenan Doğulu) - 3:35
"Ayışığı" (writer-composer: Kenan Doğulu) - 3:49
"Ara Beni Lütfen" (writer-composer: Kenan Doğulu) - 4:39
"Yüzsüz Yürek" (writer-composer: Kenan Doğulu) - 3:20
"Haykırış" (writer: Zeki Uluruh, composer: Yurdaer Doğulu) - 4:15
"Unutarak Kurtuluyorum" - 3:05
"Nereye Kadar" (writer: Kenan Doğulu, composer: Ozan Doğulu) - 4:36
"Aşk Kokusu" (Radio Mix) (writer-composer: Kenan Doğulu) - 6:58
"Aşk Kokusu" (Video Clip Version) - 4:33

Charts

References

External links

Kenan Doğulu albums
2006 albums